Dorward is a surname. Notable people by that name include:

 Arthur Dorward (British Army officer) (1848–1934)
 Arthur Dorward (1925–2015), Scottish international rugby union player
 David Dorward (born 1952), Canadian politician
 Helen Dorward (born 1933), Scottish actress who played in Children of Fire Mountain
 James Dorward (born 1841), Scottish mariner
 Nigel Dorward (born 1966), Zimbabwean cricketer
 Robert Dorward (born 1983), A melt from Braintree,Essex
 Tom Dorward (1916-1941), Scottish sportsman